Michael Joseph Ellison (1 June 1817 – 12 July 1898) was an English first-class cricketer active 1846–55 who played for Sheffield and Nottinghamshire. He became a key figure in the foundation and development of Yorkshire County Cricket Club from 1863. He was the club's first Treasurer and soon afterwards became its President. Ellison was born in Worksop and died, aged 81, in Sheffield.

Ellison played in 16 important matches as a right-handed batsman. He was judged a "useful" player only, scoring 195 runs in his 28 innings, averaging 6.96. He held one catch as a fielder and was an occasional bowler who took one wicket in 30 overs.

Ellison's significance came after he stopped playing and undertook administrative responsibilities at Sheffield Cricket Club. In 1863, he played a major role in the foundation of Yorkshire County Cricket Club. Officially, the first Club President was former Sheffield player T. R. Barker, who was then the Lord Mayor of Sheffield, although he probably never attended any meetings. Ellison was the first Treasurer but he soon afterwards assumed the Presidency. Some accounts record Ellison as Yorkshire's first President. Ellison was instrumental in bringing Martin Hawke, 7th Baron Hawke to the club. Hawke became Yorkshire's first amateur captain and Ellison gave him the task of transforming a talented but wayward team, often described as "ten drunks and a parson", into a winning one.

References

Bibliography
 
 
 

1817 births
1898 deaths
English cricketers
Sheffield Cricket Club cricketers
Nottinghamshire cricketers
English cricket administrators
Sportspeople from Worksop
Cricketers from Nottinghamshire
Presidents of Yorkshire County Cricket Club
Yorkshire cricketers
Gentlemen of the North cricketers
Gentlemen of England cricketers
Non-international England cricketers
19th-century British businesspeople